Hapoel Mahane Yehuda is an Israeli football club based in the Mahane Yehuda neighbourhood of Petah Tikva. The club currently plays in Liga Alef, the third level of Israeli football, though in the past they have played in the top division.

History
The club was founded in 1949 as Mahane Yehuda Dror. When it joined the Israel Football Association in 1950, the current name was adopted.

In 1965 the club was promoted to Liga Leumit, then the top division. In their first season they finished 8th. However, the 1966–68 season saw the club finish second bottom of the division, resulting in relegation back to Liga Alef. Since then they have remained in the lower divisions.

Between 1990 and 1993 the club was managed by Eyal Lahman.

In the 2012–13 season, the club won Liga Bet South A division and made a return to Liga Alef after 36 years.

Recent Seasons

Honours

League

External links
Hapoel Mahane Yehuda  Israel Football Association 

Mahane Yehuda
Mahane Yehuda
Association football clubs established in 1949
Sport in Petah Tikva
1949 establishments in Israel